Governor O'Brien may refer to:

Charles O'Brien (colonial administrator) (1859–1935), Acting Governor of the Gambia from 1910 to 1912, Governor of the Seychelles from 1912 to 1918, and Governor of Barbados from 1918 to 1925
George Thomas Michael O'Brien (1844–1906), Governor of Fiji from 1897 to 1901
Terence O'Brien (colonial governor) (1830–1903), Acting Governor of British Ceylon from 1863 to 1865, Governor of Heligoland from 1881 to 1888, and Colonial Governor of Newfoundland from 1889 to 1895
William O'Brien, 2nd Earl of Inchiquin (died 1692), Governor of Tangier from 1675 to 1680